William Joseph Durkin (April 22, 1922 – November 19, 2012) was an American professional basketball player. He played in the National Basketball League in one game for the Sheboygan Red Skins during the 1944–45 season. He also competed for numerous other teams in independent leagues.

References

1922 births
2012 deaths
American men's basketball players
Basketball coaches from Illinois
Basketball players from Chicago
Guards (basketball)
High school basketball coaches in Illinois
Loyola Ramblers men's basketball players
Military personnel from Illinois
Sheboygan Red Skins players
Sportspeople from Chicago
United States Army personnel of World War II